Chula Vista Elementary School District (CVESD) is a school district in California, headquartered in Chula Vista, in the South Bay area of San Diego County.

The  district, the largest Kindergarten through Grade 6 elementary school district in the State of California, is located between the City of San Diego and the United States-Mexico border. As of the 2011-2012 school year, it has 45 schools, 27,700 students, 1,421 certificated employees, and 1,077 classified employees. As of the same year, 318,148 people live in the school district boundaries.

In addition to almost all of Chula Vista, it includes Bonita, portions of San Diego, and a small piece of National City.

Demographics
As of the 2011-2012 school year, the school district has 27,700 students. Of them, 45% take free or reduced lunch and 35% are English learners. In regards to race and ethnicity, 68% are Hispanic, 13% are White, 11% are Filipino, 4% are African American, 3% are Asian or Pacific Islander, and 1% are other.

Schools
Ella B. Allen Elementary School
Arroyo Vista Charter School
Casillas Elementary School
Castle Park Elementary School
Chula Vista Hills Elementary School
Chula Vista Learning Community Charter School
Clear View Elementary School
Hazel Goes Cook Elementary School
Daly Academy 
Discovery Charter School
Eastlake Elementary School
Feaster Charter School
Myrtle S. Finney Elementary School
Halecrest Elementary School
Harborside Elementary School
Anne & William Hedenkamp
Heritage Elementary School
Hilltop Drive Elementary School
Juarez-Lincoln Elementary School
Karl H. Kellogg Elementary School
J. Calvin Lauderbach Elementary School
Liberty Elementary School
Loma Verde Elementary School
Los Altos Elementary School
Thurgood Marshall Elementary School
Corky McMillin Elementary School
John J. Montgomery Elementary School
Mueller Charter School Elementary School
Olympic View Elementary School
Otay Elementary School
Palomar Elementary School
Parkview Elementary School
Lilian J. Rice Elementary School
Rogers Elementary School
Fred H. Rohr Elementary School
Rosebank Elementary School
Saburo Muraoka Elementary School
Salt Creek Elementary School
Silver Wing Elementary School
Sunnyside Elementary School
Burton C. Tiffany Elementary School
Valle Lindo Elementary School
Valley Vista Elementary School
Veterans Elementary School
Vista Square Elementary School
Wolf Canyon Elementary School

Casillas Elementary School is named after Joseph Casillas, a World War II combat veteran that was awarded the Silver Star and a Purple Heart. Joseph Casillas was shot in the head and arm while saving his squad during the Battle of the Bulge. He was also captured by Germans, but later rescued by American forces after German troops retreated from their positions.

Independent Charter Schools Located within CVESD Boundaries
Leonardo da Vinci Health Sciences Charter School
Howard Gardner Community Charter School

References

External links

 

School districts in San Diego County, California
Education in Chula Vista, California
Education in San Diego
1892 establishments in California
School districts established in 1892